Apasra Hongsakula  (born January 16, 1947)  is a Thai businesswoman and beauty queen who won the title of Miss Universe 1965. She is a daughter of Group Captain Perm and Kayoon Hongsakula. She was the first woman from Thailand and the first Southeast Asian to win the Miss Universe title.

Biography
Apasra was born and raised in Bangkok, but she was sent to learn English at a girls secondary school in Penang, Malaysia.

She married the first cousin of Queen Sirikit, by whom she has a son. The marriage ended long ago in divorce, but she remains a revered social figure in the country. Her younger sister, Paveena, is a prominent political figure and former member of Parliament.

Her son, Passakorn, from her second marriage with Chirathivat, who in 2017 became chairman of the board of directors of Bangkok Post, got officially engaged to Rasri Balenciaga on December 8, 2017, in a ceremony presided over by Princess Soamsawali.

Pageantry

Participation
In the 1964 Miss Thailand pageant held in Bangkok, Apasra Hongsakula, a high school student from Penang, won the crown.

She then went on to compete in the 1965 Miss Universe pageant held in Miami Beach, Florida, United States where she was crowned 14th Miss Universe winner on July 28, 1965.

Judging
She returned to the pageant as a judge in 1973 and 1979.

Post pageants
 Apasra was appointed "cultural ambassador" by Tourism Authority of Thailand.
 President of Raymond Weil Watches (Thailand)
 President of Apasra Beauty Slimming Spa

Facts and trivia
 She is the third Thai representative at Miss Universe pageant.
 She got some advice from Queen Sirikit about how to strike a pose and how to walk in the pageant before she went to Miami.
 Her Thai nickname is "Pook"
 Apasra was presented a new crown by Miss Universe Organization and was crowned again at a private function by Miss Universe 1991 Lupita Jones of Mexico in 1992 when Thailand hosted the 1992 Miss Universe pageant.  Most Miss Universe titleholders in the old days did not get to keep the crown.

References

External links
Official site of Miss Thailand

1947 births
Living people
Apasra Hongsakula
Miss Universe 1965 contestants
Miss Universe winners
Apasra Hongsakula
Apasra Hongsakula
Apasra Hongsakula
Apasra Hongsakula